Hillegas is a surname. Notable people with the surname include:

Howard C. Hillegas (1872–1918), American writer, journalist and newspaper editor
Michael Hillegas (1729–1804), Treasurer of the United States
Shawn Hillegas (born 1964), American baseball player

See also
Hillegass